Laud may refer to:

 Extraordinary praise
 Laúd, a 12-string lute from Spain, played also in diaspora countries such as Cuba and the Philippines and featured in rondalla music
 Laud, Indiana, an unincorporated community in Whitley County

People with the surname Laud
 William Laud (1573–1645), Archbishop of Canterbury
 Derek Laud (born 1964), British political lobbyist

People with the given name Laud
 Laud of Coutances (6th century), bishop of Coutances
 Laud Humphreys (1930–1988), American sociologist and author

See also
 Lauds, a divine office in the Roman Catholic Church

ru:Лод (значения)